Badan Intelijen Negara Republik Indonesia ("State Intelligence Agency of the Republic of Indonesia"), commonly referred to as BIN, is Indonesia's primary intelligence agency. Prior to 2001, it was known as Bakin (Badan Koordinasi Intelijen Negara, "State Intelligence Coordinating Agency"); its name was changed as part of a general restructuring of the agency. BIN is responsible for co-ordinating information sharing and operations among Indonesia's other intelligence agencies, as well as for mounting operations on its own.

At the time of its name change in 2001, BIN's role in co-ordinating was de-emphasised. However, in the wake of the 2002 Bali bombing, the co-ordinating function was strengthened as part of an all-around expansion of the agency's mandate, which included an expanded budget. Since 9 September 2016, the agency has been headed by Budi Gunawan.

History

1943–1965 
The origin of the agency can be traced back to the Japanese occupation period. In 1943, Japan established an intelligence organization known as the Nakano Military Intelligence School. Former member of the  Defenders of the Homeland (PETA), Zulkifli Lubis, graduated from the school and was also the Republican's first Commander of Intelligence.

After independence, August 1945, the Government of Indonesia established the first intelligence agency of the republic, which was called Badan Istimewa (the Special Agency) commonly referred to as (BI).Colonel Zulkifli Lubis returned to lead the agency along with about 40 former Peta soldiers who were special military investigators. After entering a special intelligence training period in the Ambarawa region, in early May 1946 around 30 young graduates became members of the Indonesian State Secret Agency (BRANI). This agency became the umbrella for the intelligence movement with several "ad hoc" units, even overseas operations.

In July 1946, the Minister of Defense (Menhan) Amir Sjarifuddin formed the "Defense Agency B" headed by a former police commissioner. As a result, on 30 April 1947 all intelligence agencies were merged under the Minister of Defense, including Brani, to become Part V of the B Defense Agency.

In 1949 the Minister of Defense Sri Sultan Hamengkubuwono IX was not satisfied with the performance and performance of the intelligence at that time which was running independently and was not well coordinated, so Sri Sultan Hamengkubuwono IX formed Dinas Chusus (the Special Service) commonly referred to as (DC), which was expected to be able to face the challenges of the threat of the state and nation in the future, and able to protect the Republic of Indonesia. The DC recruitment program is the intelligence program of the first non-military civilian cadres in Indonesia trained by the Central Intelligence Agency (CIA). Intelligence candidates were sent to the Philippine island of Saipan to take part in a training program until several forces were then resumed training in Indonesia. The alumni were placed in various clandestine operations which were very closed and capable of penetrating enemy hearts such as operations (Operation Trikora, Dwikora, G30. S PKI, etc.). DC is known by the pseudonym Ksatria Graha, who are trained professional intelligence cadres, which are an important part that cannot be separated from the history of Indonesian intelligence.

In early 1952, the Chief of Staff of the Armed Forces, T.B. Simatupang, demoted the intelligence agency to Badan Informasi Staff Angkatan Perang (the Armed Forces Staff Information Agency) (BISAP). As a result of competition within the military, during 1952–1958, the entire force and police had their own intelligence services without national coordination. So on 5 December 1958, the President Sukarno formed the Intelligence Coordinating Body (BKI) with Colonel Laut Pirngadi as the head.

Subsequently,10 November 1959, BKI was changed back to Badan Pusat Intelijen (the Central Intelligence Agency) commonly referred to as (BPI) headquartered at Jalan Madiun, headed by Dr. Soebandrio. In the era of the 1960s until the beginning of the New Order era, Soebandrio's influence on the BPI was very strong, followed by the war of communist and non-communist ideology in the military, including intelligence.

1965–present 
After the 1965 upheaval, Soeharto headed Operasi Pemulihan Keamanan dan Ketertiban (the Operation Command for Restoring Security and Order) Kopkamtib. Subsequently, in all regions (Regional Military Command / Kodam) an Satuan Tugas Intelijen (Intelligence Task Force) (STI) was formed. Then on 22 August 1966, Suharto established Komando Intelijen Negara (the State Intelligence Command) (KIN) with Brigadier General Yoga Sugomo as the head who was directly responsible to him.

As a strategic intelligence agency, BPI was merged into KIN which also had Operasi Khusus (Special Operations) Opsus under Lt. Col. Ali Moertopo with assistants Leonardus Benyamin (Benny) Moerdani and Aloysius Sugiyanto. In less than a year, 22 May 1967 Soeharto issued a Presidential Decree (Keppres) to design KIN to Badan Koordinasi Intelijen Negara become (the National Intelligence Coordinating Board) (BAKIN). Maj. Gen. Soedirgo was appointed as the first head of BAKIN.

During the time of Maj. Gen. Sutopo Juwono, BAKIN had Deputy II under Colonel Nicklany Soedardjo, Perwira Polisi Militer ( Military Police Officer) POM officer who graduated from Fort Gordon, USA. In early 1965, Nicklany created the PM's intelligence unit, namely Detasemen Pelaksana Intelijen (the Intelligence Implementing Detachment) (Den Pintel) POM. Officially, Den Pintel POM became Satuan Khusus Intelijen (the Special Intelligence Unit) Satsus Intel, then in 1976 it became Satuan Pelaksana (the Implementing Unit) Satlak and in the 1980s it became the Implementing Unit (UP) 01.

Starting in 1970 there was a reorganization of BAKIN with the addition of Deputy III to the Opsus post under Brigadier General TNI Ali Moertopo. As a Suharto insider. Opsus is considered the most prestigious in BAKIN, ranging from domestic affairs Penentuan Pendapat Rakyat of West Irian and the birth of the political machine Golongan Karya (Golkar) to the Indochina issue. In 1983, as Deputy Head of BAKIN, L.B. Moerdani expanded his intelligence activities to become Badan Intelijen Negara (the Strategic Intelligence Agency) (BAIS). Subsequently, BAKIN remained as a contra-subversion directorate of the New Order.

After removing L.B.Moerdani as Minister of Defense and Security (Menhankam), in 1993 Suharto reduced Bais' mandate and changed its name to Badan Intelijen ABRI (ABRI Intelligence Agency) BIA. In 2000, President Abdurrahman Wahid changed BAKIN to become Badan Intelijen Negara (the State Intelligence Agency) (BIN) until now.

Thus, since 1945 s.d. now, the state intelligence organization has changed its name six times:
 BRANI (Badan Rahasia Negara Indonesia/Indonesian State Secret Agency).
 BKI (Badan Koordinasi Intelijen/Intelligence Coordination Agency).
 BPI (Badan Pusat Intelijen/Central Intelligence Agency).
 KIN (Komando Intelijen Negara/State Intelligence Command).
 BAKIN (Badan Koordinasi Intelijen Negara/State Intelligence Coordination Agency).
 BIN (Badan Intelijen Negara/State Intelligence Agency).

Organizational structure

Main organization 
The organizational structure mainly based from Presidential Decree No. 90/2012 (State Intelligence Agency). The organizational structure of the BIN was last amended by the Presidential Decree No. 79/2020 (Second Amendment of Presidential Decree No. 90/2012 Re: State Intelligence Agency). The decree was signed on 20 July 2020. Under the Presidential Regulation, the BIN's organizational structure consists of 9 deputies, which later expanded by Chief BIN Decree No. 01/2022:
 
 ChiefThe Chief of the BIN has the task to lead in performing the duties and functions of the BIN. The Chief is given the financial, administrative and other facilities on par with the Minister.
 Deputy ChiefThe Deputy Chief has the task of helping and giving aid to the intelligence chief.
 Main SecretariatMain Secretariat has the task of coordinating the implementation of the tasks, coaching and providing administrative support to all organizational units within the BIN. It consisted of:
 Bureau of Planning and Finance
 Bureau of Human Resource
 Bureau of Law, Organization, and Management
 Bureau of Logistics
 Bureau of General Affairs
 Deputy for Foreign AffairsDeputy of Foreign Affairs (Deputy I) has the tasks of policy formulation and implementation of activities and / or operations of foreign intelligence field.
 Deputy for Home AffairsDeputy of Home Affairs (Deputy II) has the tasks of policy formulation and implementation of activities and/or operations in the field of domestic intelligence.
 Deputy for Counter IntelligenceDeputy of Counter Intelligence (Deputy III) has the task of policy formulation and implementation of activities and/or counterintelligence operations.
 Deputy for Economic IntelligenceDeputy of Economy (Deputy IV) has the tasks of policy formulation and implementation of activities and/or intelligence operations in economics.
 Deputy for Technology IntelligenceDeputy for Technology (Deputy V) has the tasks of policy formulation and implementation of activities and / or intelligence operations technology.
 Deputy for Cyber IntelligenceDeputy for Cyber Intelligence (Deputy VI) has the tasks of policy formulation and implementation of activities and / or cyber intelligence operations.
 Deputy for Communications and InformationDeputy Communication and Information (Deputy VII) has the tasks of policy formulation and implementation of activities and / or intelligence operations in Communication and Information. Prior to 21 July 2017, this deputy was numbered Deputy VI.
 Deputy for Security Intelligence Apparatus Deputy Apparatuses Security Intelligence (Deputy VIII) has the tasks of performing background checking for state apparatus and its candidate, granting appropriate clearance for one who need it, policy formulation and implementation field of processing and the production of intelligence in apparatuses security, and providing suggestions and recommendations for safeguarding the government's governance. The deputy also tasked for managing and maintaining databases of state officials and other renowned figures. This deputy is the most recent, formed in July 2020.
 Deputy for Intelligence Analysis and ProductionDeputy Intelligence Analysis and Production (Deputy IX) has the tasks of policy formulation and implementation field of processing and the production of intelligence. Prior to 21 July 2017, this deputy was numbered Deputy VII.
 General Inspectorate  General Inspectorate has the task on oversight of BIN internal affairs, In present, BIN have a main inspectorate and three subordinate inspectorate offices:
 Main Inspectorate
 Inspectorate I (Performance)
 Inspectorate II (Personnel)
 Inspectorate III (Administrative)
 Expert Staffs Expert Staffs have the task of giving recommendations to the chief on specific matters. Currently, BIN have expert staffs in several fields:
 Political and Ideology
 Social and Culture
 Law and Human Rights
 Defense and Security
 Natural Resources and Environment
 CentersCenters are supporting units or centers established by BIN for specific purposes. Their formation is regulated by Decrees issued by the Chief of BIN. As of 2022, these centers are:
 Intelligence Professional Development Center
 Research and Development Center
 Education and Training Center
 Medical Intelligence Center
 Psychology Center
 Regional BIN OfficesRegional BIN Offices are regional offices located in each provinces that carried BIN functions in domestic intelligence. These offices are subordinate to Deputy II. All regional BIN offices possess the same structure:
 Office of Head of Regional BIN Office
 Division of Operations
 Area Coordinators (placed in all cities and/or regencies within the province)
 Extra-territorial BIN Representative OfficesExtra-territorial BIN Representative Offices are BIN representative offices located in foreign lands. These offices are subordinate to Deputy I.
 Technical Implementation UnitsThese units are specialized units founded by BIN to carry on some specialized functions and implementation. Currently, there are two Technical Implementation Units:
 State Intelligence College, the primary training facility of BIN
 State Intelligence Museum, the intelligence museum operated by BIN for training and archival purposes
 Task forces Task forces are units operated under the auspices of the Office of Head of BIN. They are not permanent, only being formed (or re-activated) for special functions with limited purposes.

Training facility 
BIN possessed primary education and training facility called STIN, Sekolah Tinggi Intelijen Negara (State Intelligence College). It has undergraduate, master, and doctoral level education for intelligence in Indonesia. All BIN graduates will become part BIN human resource after graduation. During COVID-19 pandemic situation, in September 2019, Budi Gunawan announced that STIN will open Medical Intelligence program. In April 2021, STIN opened their Medical Intelligence program, along with the expansion of the programs under STIN.

The current training programs of STIN are:

 Undergraduate
 Intelligence Agent
 Intelligence Technology
 Cyber Intelligence
 Economic Intelligence
 Master
 Intelligence Studies
 Applied Economic Intelligence
 Applied Cyber and Technology Intelligence
 Medical Intelligence
 Chemical and Nuclear Hazard
 Biohazard 
 Doctoral
 Strategic Intelligence Analysis
Aside of the STIN, BIN possessed another education and training facility called Education and Training Center, under the Main Secretariat office. Unlike training provided by STIN, training in Education and Training Center are much specialized.

Para-commando unit 
BIN also possessed at least one para-commando force unit. A unit codenamed "Rajawali" (Eagle) disclosed by Bambang Soesatyo, Speaker of People's Consultative Assembly. The existence of the unit surprised many Indonesians, as most Indonesians never know that the unit really exist. The unit signified with black full-body clad military attire, similar like Koopsus combat attire. In the press release, BIN acknowledged that Rajawali Force is a BIN specialized trained force trained in "special threats handling and deterrence". BIN also said that the unit does not has specific name attached, and every year, the name of the force always changed. Most of the details of the unit other than this are not disclosed.

Activities
 In 1973, BIN initiated Operation Onta (Camel), a ten-day stakeout against members of the Iraqi embassy and Yemeni consulate. Two further surveillance blitzes Onta II and Onta III were conducted against the same diplomats by the third quarter. Also in September, Intelligence Task Force Satsus Intel drew up plans to permanently station a team at Jakarta's Kemayoran international airport; this team soon began archiving color photographs of Arab passports from over a dozen nations and comparing the names of arrivals to a terrorist watch list compiled by cooperative foreign intelligence services. None of these countries stoked more Indonesian suspicion than Yemen. BIN conducted surveillance on the Yemeni consulate for almost a decade but never found important information and communism wasn't spread to Indonesia.
 in 1982, BIN and Kopkamtib managed to capture Alexander Pavlovich Vinenko a GRU agent disguised as an Aeroflot manager in Jakarta and Lieutenant Colonel Sergei Egorov the Soviet assistant military attaché, with the help of Lieutenant Colonel Susdaryanto, an officer in the Indonesian Navy who was willing to cooperate catching The Soviets spy after had previously been arrested by BIN for selling information about the sea in Indonesia and the Indonesian Navy, but due to political pressure from the Soviets, they were finally released after being given persona non grata, and Susdaryanto continued to work with BIN to uncover other Soviet spy.
 In 1998, José Ramos-Horta said that Indonesia intelligence agency was spying on East Timorese exiles around the world.

 In early 2002, it was derided by ministers and senior politicians when it emerged that BIN had written separate and contradictory reports on the economy for cabinet ministers and a parliamentary committee. BIN also prepared an error-filled briefing for parliament's Foreign Affairs and Security Commission prior to John Howard's visit to Indonesia in February. Among other things, it alleged that Australia's Lt-Gen Peter Cosgrove had written an autobiography denigrating Indonesia's role in East Timor. It also asserted that the Howard government had formed a secret twelve-person committee to engineer Papua's secession from Indonesia.

  In 2002,BIN in coordination with Kopassus's Anti-Terror unit Sat-81 successfully captured Islamist militant Omar al-Faruq. He was later handed over to U.S authorities.

 In 2004, the retiring chief of BIN General Abdullah Mahmud Hendropriyono admitted that Indonesia had bugged Australia's embassy in Jakarta during the East Timorese crisis in 1999 and has tried to recruit Australian spies.

 In 2005, BIN was found to have used the charitable foundation of the former Indonesian president Abdurrahman Wahid to hire a Washington lobbying firm in 2005 to pressure the US government for a full restart of military training programs in Indonesia.

 It has been alleged that BIN was involved in the poisoning of Indonesian human rights activist Munir Said Thalib on board a Garuda Indonesia flight from Jakarta to Amsterdam. Top level BIN officials were implicated in his murder, and a BIN deputy chairman, Muchdi Purwopranjono was tried and acquitted in court for the assassination attempt in a trial that was internationally condemned as a "sham trial". In 2014, former BIN chief A.M Hendropriyono admitted that he bore "command responsibility" for the assassination, and he was ready to accept being put on trial.

 In 2015,The Investment Coordinating Board (BKPM) is to team up with the National Intelligence Agency (BIN) to generate more reliable data on the political and security condition in new investment sites. BKPM chief Franky Sibarani said BIN could provide accurate information on the local social and political condition which would help generate site-specific investment policies, but some environmental activists warn that intelligence reports on local sentiment could be manipulated to stymie community opposition to development projects.

 In 2020 The Indonesian chief security minister admitted that the US Central Intelligence Agency has provided data about Indonesian militants who have fought for the Islamic State in foreign countries.Indonesia has refused to repatriate more than 600 stranded militants from Syria, Iraq, Turkey and some other countries, but it may allow the return of children orphaned by the war.

 In COVID-19 pandemic situation in Indonesia, BIN also play significant role in controlling pandemic situation in Indonesia. While initially caused controversy, the BIN role and involvement in controlling and neutralizing medical threats actually legalized and mandated by the Law No. 17/2011 (Intelligence). The controversy later died out after that BIN, together with Indonesian Intelligence Community, research centers, universities, and ministries also actively researching COVID-19 and developing Indonesia-made vaccines, test kits, and cures, as well joined with local health department to administer tests and vaccination. Joko Widodo even endorsed BIN to perform vaccination door-to-door to the community, in which BIN later executed by sending their medical agents to the local neighborhood so people from remote and inaccessible location, or who unable to attend the vaccination sites can get vaccine. BIN also provide funding for universities for COVID-19 researches in Indonesia.

 In September 2021 not long after the Taliban took control of Afghanistan, Deputy VII of the State Intelligence Agency (BIN) Wawan Hari Purwanto said that BIN continued to communicate with the Taliban to prevent terrorism from reaching Indonesia, and BIN also continued to monitor groups with ties to the Taliban and gathering Indonesian former fighters who had joined the Mujahideen in the war Soviet–Afghan War to communicate with them to prevent acts of terrorism in Indonesia

 In 2022 Conflict Armament Research (car) reported that BIN purchased more than 2500 mortar Shell converted to be air dropped from Serbia to be used in Papua in October 2020, (CAR) said the mortar rounds were manufactured by Serbia's state-owned arms maker Krusik and later modified to be dropped from the air rather than fired from a mortar tube. It said the arms sent to BIN also included 3,000 electronic initiators and three timing devices typically used to detonate explosives. Reuters was not able to independently confirm certain aspects of the CAR report, including whether BIN had received the shipment. Reuters also could not establish who authorised the purchase of the munitions or who used them in Papua,some experts believe the attack was retaliation for the death of the head of BIN in Papua in April 2021.

References 

Government agencies of Indonesia
Indonesian intelligence agencies